HP5 or variant, may refer to:

 HP5, a postcode for Chesham, see HP postcode area
 hP5, a Pearson symbol
 Harry Potter and the Order of the Phoenix, the fifth Harry Potter novel
 Harry Potter and the Order of the Phoenix (film), the fifth Harry Potter film
 Handley Page Type E a.k.a. H.P.5, an airplane
 HP-5, a glider designed by Richard Schreder
 HP5 and HP5+, a type of photographic stock, see Ilford HP

See also
HP (disambiguation)